LogDNA is a technology company located in Silicon Valley, California. They provide log management products intended to aggregate system and application logs into a single platform.

History 

The company was founded by Chris Nguyen and Lee Liu in 2016 after participating in Y Combinator’s Winter 2015 batch.

On May 24, 2022, the company rebranded as Mezmo, stating that the "new corporate identity that reflects the company’s expanding capabilities and vision for observability."

Technology 

LogDNA provides a Software as a Service-based log management system that helps centralize logs from various applications, servers, platforms and systems into a web viewer. The software works with a wide variety of infrastructures and architectures, supporting numerous platforms and ingestion methods, such as syslog, code libraries, and AWS.

IBM Partnership 

In 2018, LogDNA partnered with IBM to launch two observability products for the IBM Cloud Kubernetes Service. They jointly launched a log analysis software intended to help users gain insights into their system and application logs. as well as a cloud activity tracker that tracks events from IBM Cloud services so that users have more visibility into their deployments.

Awards and recognition 

In 2020, LogDNA won the IBM Cloud Embed Excellence Award during the IBM Think 2020 conference and was named to the Enterprise Tech 30 list. Also in 2020, LogDNA won the Spring G2 Crowd Best Software awards for the categories of Easiest Setup, Most Implementable, Momentum Leader and Best Usability. In 2019, Forbes included LogDNA on its Cloud 100 Rising Stars list, Upstart Tech named LogDNA its “Most Implementable” technology, and LogDNA was included in Silicon Review’s Smartest 50 Companies of the Year list.

References

Technology companies of the United States
System administration
Web log analysis software